Oratorio Society may refer to:

Oratorio Society of Baltimore
Oratorio Society of Charlottesville-Albemarle
Oratorio Society of Chicago
Hong Kong Oratorio Society
Jakarta Oratorio Society
Laurel Oratorio Society
Oratorio Society of Minnesota
Moscow Oratorio Society
Oratorio Society of New Jersey
Oratorio Society of New York
Oratorio Society of Queens
Rochester Oratorio Society
Saskatoon Oratorio Society
Oratorio Society of Utah
Westchester Oratorio Society